George Horner (Přerov, September 15, 1923 - April 23, 2015) was a Czech born pianist and later cardiopulmonologist at Lankenau Medical Center in Wynnewood, Pennsylvania.

In 1942, Horner his parents and sister were sent to Terezin, the "show" concentration camp northwest of Prague. Horner played piano and accordion for composer Gideon Klein and cabaret artist Karel Švenk. The family was sent to Auschwitz where the rest of his family were killed. Horner survived the death march after the camp was abandoned and returned to Prague to finish his studies. After emigrating to Australia to earn his medical degree, he then moved with his wife and sons to America in 1964.

On 22 October 2013 he performed Karel Švenk's cabaret tunes at Boston Symphony Hall with Yo-Yo Ma.  Horner died April 23, 2015, in Newtown Square, Pennsylvania.

References

1923 births
2015 deaths
Czechoslovak emigrants to Australia
Australian emigrants to the United States
Czechoslovak pianists
American physicians